10 Lancelot Place is a residential building in Knightsbridge, London.

Location
It is located at 10 Lancelot Place. It is part of Knightsbridge Estates.

History
The building was designed by Zeidler Partnership Architects. Built with red bricks and Portland stones, it was completed in 2008.

From the penthouse, there is a vista of the Royal Albert Hall, the Natural History Museum, Harrods, Hyde Park.

References

Residential buildings completed in 2008
Knightsbridge